中央 may refer to:
Chūō (disambiguation)
Zhongyang (disambiguation)